Jimtown is a small unincorporated community in Love County, Oklahoma, United States. It lies at an altitude of 761 feet (232 m).

References

Unincorporated communities in Oklahoma
Unincorporated communities in Love County, Oklahoma